Plainfield is a town in Guilford, Liberty, and Washington townships, Hendricks County, Indiana, United States. The population was 27,631 at the 2010 census, and in 2019 the estimated population was 35,287.

History

In 1822 a tract of land which included the area now known as Plainfield was obtained by Jeremiah Hadley of Preble County, Ohio. Ten years later he sold it to his son, Elias Hadley. Levi Jessup and Elias Hadley laid out the town in 1839. Plainfield was incorporated as a town in 1839. The town got its name from the early Friends (Quakers) who settled around the area and established several meetinghouses throughout the county, including the important Western Yearly Meeting of Friends in Plainfield. The Friends were "plain" people, and thus the name "Plainfield". The high school continues to honor the Quakers, using the name for the school's mascot.

Plainfield has long been associated with the National Road, U.S. Route 40, which goes through town as Main Street. One incident which brought Plainfield national attention occurred in 1842 when former President Martin Van Buren was spilled deliberately from his stagecoach into the thick mud of the highway. The practical joke came as a result of Van Buren's vetoing a bill from Congress to improve the highway, a move which angered Western settlers. When Van Buren came through Plainfield on a swing to shore up his popularity for the 1844 election, a group of perpetrators set up the incident. The elm tree whose roots caused the president's carriage to topple became known as the Van Buren Elm. An elementary school near this site is named Van Buren Elementary School.

In the 1980s Plainfield became the headquarters of the Islamic Society of North America.

The Hendricks County Bridge Number 316, Plainfield Historic District, and THI and E Interurban Depot-Substation are listed on the National Register of Historic Places.

Geography

Plainfield is located in the Central Till Plains region of the United States. There are few moderately sized hills, and a mix of deciduous forests and prairie covers much of the area within the town limits. White Lick Creek, a tributary of the White River, flows north to south through the western side of Plainfield. On the eastern side of town, Clark's Creek, a tributary of White Lick Creek, flows towards the south.

U.S. Route 40, also known as the Historic National Road and the Cumberland Road, passes through the middle of Plainfield and is the main arterial route running east to west in the town. From north to south runs Quaker Boulevard (former SR 267).

Plainfield's town center is situated around the intersection of U.S. Route 40 and Center Street, also known as Old State Highway 267.

Indianapolis International Airport borders the east side of Plainfield, in Marion County.

Demographics

2010 census
As of the census of 2010, there were 27,631 people, 9,747 households, and 6,756 families residing in the town. The racial makeup of the town was 85.7% White, 7.8% African American, 0.1% Native American, 3.2% Asian, 1.4% from other races, and 1.7% from two or more races. Hispanic or Latino of any race were 3.9% of the population.

There were 9,747 households, of which 37.1% had children under the age of 18 living with them, 52.0% were married couples living together, 12.3% had a female householder with no husband present, 5.0% had a male householder with no wife present, and 30.7% were non-families. 25.7% of all households were made up of individuals, and 8.7% had someone living alone who was 65 years of age or older. The average household size was 2.57 and the average family size was 3.08.

The median age in the town was 35.5 years. 24.5% of residents were under the age of 18; 9% were between the ages of 18 and 24; 30.9% were from 25 to 44; 24.3% were from 45 to 64; and 11.3% were 65 years of age or older. The gender makeup of the town was 52.8% male and 47.2% female.

Economy

The economic engine of Plainfield is the sprawling warehouse district on the east side of town, close to the Indianapolis International Airport, that boasts approximately 45 million square feet of space.  Plainfield provides roughly 50% of all warehouse jobs in central Indiana.

"The Shops at Perry Crossing" is a  open-air retail mall. It opened in October 2005 and was purchased in February 2014 by Poag Shopping Centers, which currently operates the mall. The mall received a $11.1 million renovation and rebranding project to revitalize the shopping center; the project concluded in November 2015.

Plainfield boasts 18 hotels, including an Embassy Suites full-service hotel and conference center.  The town's proximity to the Indianapolis airport and Interstate 70 have made it an attractive location for hotel space.

The town is currently renovating the downtown area with a new apartment complex, The Barlow, as well as an upcoming Performing and Fine Arts Center, connected to the government building.

Arts and culture
The town has a lending library, the Plainfield-Guilford Township Public Library. The library contains an upstairs art gallery showcasing local artists and photographers. There are a few murals located around town including behind and besides local staple, Al's Donuts. Plainfield High School (Indiana) has an award winning music department, including the 2017 ISSMA Showchoir state champions, 2018 ISSMA Marching Band State Champions, and 2022 World Championship Drumline finalists. Plainfield is also home to the Launch Pad, a music school and recording studio for musicians of any age to utilize. In 2024, the new Performing and Fine Arts Center connected to the new government building is set to open, providing a spacious event center for performers of all kinds.

There is also an indoor waterpark with three lap lanes, a walking river with current, a kids' play area, and a large waterslide.

Hummel Park is a  park with a  wooden bridge across White Lick Creek.  The park features sports venues, basketball and volleyball courts, baseball diamonds, nature trails, fishing lakes and an amphitheater.

Government
The Plainfield Correctional Facility (formerly Indiana Youth Center) of the Indiana Department of Correction is in the western part of Plainfield. As of 2019, the prison housed 1,497 inmates, and employed 341 staff.

Education

Public school system
Plainfield's public education system is run by the Plainfield Community School Corporation. The schools under this body include:

 Guilford Elementary School 
 Brentwood Elementary School
 Central Elementary School
 Van Buren Elementary School
 Clarks Creek Elementary School
 Plainfield Community Middle School
 Plainfield High School

The Plainfield Community School Corporation is the only public school system in Indiana to have all of its schools receive a 4-star rating for two consecutive years. In 2019, a petition requesting a Master Plan and Architectural and Site Design Review for a new elementary school complex located south and west of the intersection of Hadley and Moon Roads (Guildford Elementary). Hendricks County has ceded planning jurisdiction to the Town of Plainfield for this project. In 2009, a new High School was constructed.  The former High School became the Middle School, and the former middle school building was converted into "Clarks Creek Elementary", an upper elementary school for grades 4-5. However, as of the 2019-2020 school year, the corporation changed this setup to a High School (9-12), Middle School(6-8), and Five K-5 elementary schools.

Private school systems
Private schools in Plainfield include St. Susanna Catholic School, which is run by St. Susanna Catholic Church of Plainfield.

Notable people
 Mark Hampton, notable interior designer, was from Plainfield.
 Del Harris, basketball coach, was raised in Plainfield.
 Lawson Harvey, Justice of the Indiana Supreme Court
 Ron McQueeney, director of photography at Indianapolis Motor Speedway, was raised in Plainfield.
 Chris Stout, founding director of the Center for Global Initiatives, graduated from Plainfield High School.
 Forrest Tucker, actor, was born in Plainfield.
 James Hurst (American football), offensive lineman for the New Orleans Saints.
 Ms. Pat, comedian, moved to Plainfield in 2006

See also

References

Towns in Hendricks County, Indiana
Towns in Indiana
Populated places established in 1839
National Road
Indianapolis metropolitan area
1839 establishments in Indiana